Miyoshi Station is the name of two train stations in Japan:

 Miyoshi Station (Hiroshima) (三次駅)
 Miyoshi Station (Kumamoto)  (御代志駅)